Copper Canyon Press is an independent, non-profit small press, founded in 1972 specializing exclusively in the publication of poetry. It is located in Port Townsend, Washington.

Copper Canyon Press publishes new collections of poetry by both popular and emerging American poets, translations of classical and contemporary work from many of the world's cultures, re-issues of out-of-print poetry classics, prose books about poetry, and anthologies.

The press achieved national attention when Copper Canyon poet W.S. Merwin won the 2005 National Book Award for Poetry in the same year another Copper Canyon poet, Ted Kooser, won the 2005 Pulitzer Prize for Poetry and was appointed to a second year as United States Poet Laureate. Merwin later won the 2009 Pulitzer Prize for Poetry and in 2010 was named United States Poet Laureate.
Copper Canyon has published more than 400 titles, including works by Nobel Prize Laureates Pablo Neruda, Odysseas Elytis, Octavio Paz, Vicente Aleixandre and Rabindranath Tagore; Pulitzer Prize-winners Ted Kooser, Carolyn Kizer, Maxine Kumin, Theodore Roethke, and W.S. Merwin; National Book Award winners Hayden Carruth, Lucille Clifton, and Ruth Stone; and some contemporary poets and translators such as Jim Harrison, C. D. Wright, Bill Porter (aka Red Pine), Norman Dubie, Eleanor Wilner, Arthur Sze, James Richardson, Tom Hennen and Lucia Perillo.  In 2003 it published The Complete Poems of Kenneth Rexroth.
  

The press published What About This: Collected Poems of Frank Stanford to great critical acclaim in 2015. In his New York Times review, Dwight Garner complimented the press for performing a "vital and difficult task" and giving the reader "a chance to see him (Stanford) whole." National Public Radio called the book's release "the big event in poetry for 2015."

Also in 2015, Copper Canyon Press acquired the U.S. rights to a manuscript of lost poems by Nobel Laureate Pablo Neruda. Discovered by archivists from The Pablo Neruda Foundation in the summer of 2014 just after the April 2013 exhumation of Neruda's body in Chile, this collection of poems has been called "a literary event of universal importance" and "the biggest find in Spanish literature in recent years". The collection, Then Come Back: The Lost Neruda Poems, translated by Pulitzer finalist Forrest Gander, was released in April 2016 and includes full-color, facsimile presentations of Neruda's handwritten poems. Copper Canyon was also awarded the rights to publish Neruda's first book, Crepusulario, which has also never appeared in the U.S. in English translation.

Major prizes
 Jericho Brown - 2020 Pulitzer Prize for Poetry for The Tradition
 Arthur Sze - 2019 National Book Award for Poetry for Sight Lines
 Ocean Vuong - 2017 T.S. Eliot Prize for Night Sky with Exit Wounds
 Natalie Diaz - 2013 American Book Award for When My Brother Was an Aztec
 Laura Kasischke - 2011 National Book Critics Circle Award for Space, In Chains
 C.D. Wright - 2010 National Book Critics Circle Award for One With Others
 W.S. Merwin - 2009 Pulitzer Prize for Poetry for The Shadow of Sirius
 Ted Kooser - 2005 Pulitzer Prize for Poetry for Delights and Shadows
 W.S. Merwin - 2005 National Book Award for Poetry for Migrations: New and Selected Poems
 Ruth Stone - 2002 National Book Award for Poetry for In the Next Galaxy
 Hayden Carruth - 1996 National Book Award for Poetry for Scrambled Eggs & Whiskey

References

Book publishing companies based in Washington (state)
Companies based in Port Townsend, Washington
Non-profit organizations based in Washington (state)
Publishing companies established in 1972
American companies established in 1972
1972 establishments in Washington (state)